Paragomphus zambeziensis is a species of dragonfly in the family Gomphidae. It is endemic to Zimbabwe.  Its natural habitat is rivers. It is threatened by habitat loss.

References

Endemic fauna of Zimbabwe
Gomphidae
Taxonomy articles created by Polbot
Insects described in 1961
Insects of Zimbabwe